KZLA (98.3 FM, "Old School 98.3") is a radio station licensed to serve Riverdale, California. The station is owned by Riverdale Broadcasting, LLC.

History
The station was assigned the KHRN call letters by the Federal Communications Commission on June 15, 2000. On September 5, 2006, the station changed its call sign to the current KZLA.

The KZLA call sign had previously belonged to Emmis Communications for a country music station in Los Angeles; on August 17, 2006, the country format was replaced and in September the call sign was changed. More details of that station's history are at KLLI (FM) "Cali 93.9".

References

External links

ZLA
Radio stations established in 2003
Fresno County, California
Rhythmic oldies radio stations in the United States